List of The Flash episodes may refer to:

 List of The Flash (1990 TV series) episodes, the CBS 1990 TV series.
 List of The Flash episodes, The CW 2014 TV series.